Unravelled Knots, by Baroness Orczy, author of the Scarlet Pimpernel series, contains thirteen short stories about the Old Man in the Corner, Orzy's armchair detective who solves crimes for his own entertainment. This is the last of three books of short stories featuring the detective and follows those in The Old Man in the Corner and The Case of Miss Elliott.

In these first person narratives, a woman, presumedly the Polly Burton of The Old Man in the Corner, visits a tea-house after an absence of twenty years to find the Man in the Corner just as she had last seen him years before, fidgeting with his string and with mysteries to unravel. She is fascinated by the unlikely unravelings she hears, but despite her sarcasm and pride in her own investigative talents she remains the learner, impressed in spite of herself. The book is also notable for the development of the Old Man himself as a character; while in previous books he would simply extoll the genius of a criminal who outwitted the police while never lifting a finger to bring them to justice, here he occasionally recommends that his listener publish his writings (whenever the circumstances will protect her from a libel suit), or references having notified the police about a conclusion.

Seven of these stories originally appeared in the London Magazine (1923–1924) and five in Hutchinson's Magazine (1924–1925).

Contents
 The Mystery of the Khaki Tunic
 The Mystery of the Ingres Masterpiece
 The Mystery of the Pearl Necklace
 The Mystery of the Russian Prince
 The Mysterious Tragedy in Bishop'S Road
 The Mystery of the Dog's Tooth Cliff
 The Tytherton Case
 The Mystery of Brudenell Court
 The Mystery of the White Carnation
 The Mystery of the Montmartre Hat
 The Miser of Maida Vale
 The Fulton Gardens Mystery
 A Moorland Tragedy

External links
 Unravelled Knots at Project Gutenberg Australia
 

1925 short story collections
Short story collections by Baroness Emma Orczy
Mystery short story collections
Hutchinson (publisher) books